A garrote or garrote vil (a Spanish word; alternative spellings include garotte and similar variants) is a weapon, usually a handheld ligature of chain, rope, scarf, wire or fishing line, used to strangle a person.

Assassination weapon

A garrote can be made out of many different materials, including ropes, cloth, cable ties, fishing lines, nylon, guitar strings, telephone cord or piano wire. A stick may be used to tighten the garrote; the Spanish word refers to the stick itself. In Spanish, the term may also refer to a rope and stick used to constrict a limb as a torture device.

Since World War II, the garrote has been regularly employed as a weapon by soldiers as a silent means of killing sentries and other enemy personnel. Instruction in the use of purpose-built and improvised garrottes is included in the training of many elite military units and special forces. A typical military garrote consists of two wooden handles attached to a length of flexible wire; the wire is looped over a sentry's head and pulled taut in one motion. Soldiers of the French Foreign Legion have used a particular type of double-loop garrote (referred to as la loupe), where a double coil of rope or cord is dropped around a victim's neck and then pulled taut. Even if the victim pulls on one of the coils, the other is tightened.

Garrote-like assassination techniques were widely employed in 17th- and 18th-century India, particularly by the Thuggee cult. Practitioners used a yellow silk or cloth scarf called a rumāl. The Indian version of the garrote frequently incorporates a knot at the center intended to aid in crushing the larynx, decreasing the communication capabilities of the victim, while someone applies pressure to the victim's back, usually using a foot or knee.

Execution device

The garrote is known to have been used in the first century BC in Rome. It is referred to in accounts of the Second Catilinian Conspiracy, where conspirators including Publius Cornelius Lentulus Sura were strangled with a laqueus in the Tullianum, and the implement is shown in some early reliefs, e.g., Répertoire de Reliefs grecs et romains, tome I, p. 341 (1919). It was also used in the Middle Ages in Spain and Portugal. It was employed during the conquista of the Americas, notably in the execution of the Inca emperor Atahualpa.

In the Ottoman Empire, execution by strangulation was reserved for very high officials and members of the ruling family. Unlike the Spanish version, a bowstring was used instead of a tightening collar.

During the Peninsular War of 1808–1814, French forces regularly used the garrote to execute Spanish guerrilleros, priests, and other opponents of Napoleonic rule. Around 1810 the earliest known metallic garrote appeared in Spain, and on 28 April 1828, the garrote was declared the sole method of executing civilians in that country. In May 1897, the last public garroting in Spain was performed in Barcelona. After that, all executions were performed inside prisons.

Abolition
The last civilian executions in Spain, both by garroting, were those of the poisoner Pilar Prades in May 1959 and the spree killer José María Jarabo in July 1959. Recent legislation had caused many crimes (such as robbery–murder) to fall under the jurisdiction of military law; thus, prosecutors rarely requested civilian executions. Military executions were still performed in Spain until the 1970s. The garrotings of Heinz Chez (real name Georg Michael Welzel) and Salvador Puig Antich in March 1974, both convicted in the Francoist State of killing police officers, were the last state-sanctioned garrotings in Spain and in the world.

With the 1973 Penal Code, prosecutors once again started requesting execution in civilian cases, but the death penalty was abolished in 1978 after caudillo Francisco Franco's death. The last man to be sentenced to death by garroting was José Luis Cerveto "el asesino de Pedralbes" in October 1977, for a double robbery–murder in May 1974. Cerveto requested execution, but his sentence was commuted. Another prisoner whose civilian death sentence was commuted was businessman Juan Ballot, for the contract killing of his wife in Navarre in November 1973.

In Spain, the death penalty was abolished after a new constitution was adopted in 1978. The writer Camilo José Cela obtained a garrote (which had probably been used for the execution of Puig Antich) he was an anti-capitalist militant who fought against the Franco dictatorship from the Consejo General del Poder Judicial to display at his foundation. The device was kept in storage in Barcelona. It was displayed in the room that the Cela Foundation devoted to his novel La familia de Pascual Duarte until Puig Antich's family asked for its removal.

In 1990, Andorra became the last country to officially abolish the death penalty by garrotting, though this method had not been employed there since the late 12th century.

Notable people executed by garroting

References

External links 
 

Execution equipment
Execution methods
Instruments of torture
Torture